Senator Weston may refer to:

Byron Weston (1832–1898), Massachusetts State Senate
Carol Weston (politician) (fl. 2000s–2010s), Maine State Senate
William Weston (Vermont politician) (1803–1875), Vermont State Senate